The Neapolitan Republic was a republic created in the Kingdom of Naples, which lasted from October 22, 1647, to April 5, 1648. It began after the successful revolt led by Masaniello and Giulio Genoino against King Philip III and his viceroys.

The leader of the Republic was Henry II of Lorraine, duke of Guise, descendant of the former king of Naples Rene I of Anjou.

All indicated the double nature of the Republic, both republican and monarchical, and "" was a purposeful comparison with the famous Italian maritime republic with the same title, Venice. The coat of arms was a red shield with the motto S.P.Q.N., in imitation of the Roman motto S.P.Q.R. ("The Senate and the People of Rome"); thus, the Neapolitan phrase meant "The Senate and People of Naples". The coat of arms contained the crest of the duke of Guise.

History

The Kingdom of Naples had been in personal union with the crown of Spain since 1504. In the first half of the 17th century Naples was in the midst of a harsh economic crisis, one which was affecting all of Europe. In Naples it was worsened by a viceregal government with few local concerns, interested only in helping to finance the series of continent wide wars in which Spain had become entangled.

Though repressed by the forces of viceroy Don Rodrigo Ponce de León, which had been able to restore order in almost all of the city, Masaniello's revolt had left in the streets a strong discontent. When a fleet led by John of Austria the Younger, King Philip's son, came "to soothe the last insurgents" by cannonading the city, a new revolt broke out.

The viceroy's army was expelled and a Republic declared. Neapolitans sought French support and called Henry of Guise to be entrusted with the leadership of the new state. The duke of Guise was in Rome at that moment and accepted the offer, being eager to have a crown and to reinstate French influence in southern Italy after two centuries. On November 15, 1647, he landed in Naples and took the reins of the Republic.

The Neapolitan Republic had, in fact, no hopes from the very beginning. The viceroy's forces controlled the line of castles around the city and the nobility controlled the provinces from their base in Aversa, thus controlling supply lines into Naples. In 1648 the duke of Guise managed to take Aversa, but the situation did not change much. The king's army, again under the command of John of Austria, chose a prudent strategy and filled Naples with spies, agitators and other agents to win over the remaining nobles.

On April 5, 1648, Henry, deceitfully pressed by some of his counsellors who were in Philip's pay, tried a sally, and Naples was reconquered by its former masters without resistance. On June 4 a French fleet of 40 ships tried to reconquer the city, but this time the people, tired by more than a year of continuing "revolution", did not rise. The French attempted to land on the neighbouring island of Procida, but they were beaten by Spanish forces and had to flee.

Another and even more powerful French fleet appeared in the Gulf of Naples on August 4 of the same year, led by Thomas of Savoy. This time they managed to conquer Procida but, after being repulsed by Spanish naval forces near Ischia, Pozzuoli and Salerno, they abandoned any hope of taking Naples.

Soon after, Gennaro Annese was beheaded in Piazza del Mercato in Naples.

The following year, on June 3, there were new riots in Naples, but they were soon suppressed, as the people had simply grown weary of fighting.

See also
 History of Naples
 List of Neapolitan viceroys

17th century in Naples
Italian states
States and territories established in 1647
1647 establishments in Europe
1648 disestablishments in Europe
Thirty Years' War